The 2011 D.C. United Women season was the team's inaugural season. For the 2011 season, D.C. United Women played in the W-League, the second tier of women's professional soccer in the United States and Canada, specifically in the Northeast Division of the Eastern Conference.

United began the season on May 25 and concluded the regular season on July 10. They won their first match against the New York Magic 3–0 with goals by Christine Nairn and Bri Hovington. The team finished the regular season with a 5-3-2 record, tied on points for second place in the division with the New Jersey Wildcats. However, they lost the tiebreaker on head-to-head competition and therefore fell short of making the W-League playoffs.

Match results

W-League 

The D.C. United Women played their inaugural match against New Jersey fielding a lineup which featured two former USWNT players.

W-League

Standings 
Division

1New Jersey were deducted one point for roster violations

Results by round

Club

Roster 
As of June 6, 2011

Team management and staff

Statistics

Field players 
{|| class="wikitable sortable"
|-
!
!
!Player
!
!
!
!
!
!
!
!
!
!
|- align=center
| ||2 ||align=left|Bush Christy Bush
|MF ||7 ||0 ||248 ||0 ||0 ||0 ||1 ||0 ||0
|- align=center
| ||3 ||align=left|Brown, M.Madyson Brown
|DF ||7 ||0 ||425 ||0 ||0 ||8 ||6 ||0 ||0
|- align=center
| ||4 ||align=left|VisavakulBo Visavakul
|DF ||1 ||0 ||9 ||0 ||0 ||0 ||1 ||0 ||0
|- align=center
| ||5 ||align=left|PortoJill Porto
|MF ||5 ||2 ||105 ||1 ||0 ||3 ||1 ||0 ||0 
|- align=center
| ||6 ||align=left|MenzieKatie Menzie
|MF ||8 ||0 ||654 ||0 ||0 ||9 ||1 ||0 ||0 
|- align=center
| ||7 ||align=left|WelshChristie Welsh
|FW ||6 ||6 ||184 ||3 ||0 ||9 ||1 ||1 ||0 
|- align=center
| ||8 ||align=left|CumminsBrittany Cummins
|MF ||9 ||0 ||505 ||0 ||0 ||3 ||3 ||0 ||0 
|- align=center
| ||9 ||align=left|Watson, K.Katie Watson
|FW ||7 ||0 ||505 ||0 ||0 ||2 ||1 ||0 ||0 
|- align=center
| ||10 ||align=left|ClaytonAmalya Clayton
|FW ||7 ||2 ||365 ||1 ||0 ||6 ||0 ||0 ||0 
|- align=center
| ||12 ||align=left|SiegelHayley Siegel
|MF ||8 ||5 ||604 ||2 ||1 ||9 ||9 ||0 ||0 
|- align=center
| ||13 ||align=left|Brown, T.Tyfanny Brown
|FW ||10 ||2 ||736 ||1 ||0 ||13 ||5 ||0 ||0 
|- align=center
| ||14 ||align=left|DavidsonElisa Davidson
|DF ||5 ||0 ||147 ||0 ||0 ||0 ||0 ||0 ||0 
|- align=center
| ||15 ||align=left|AbeggMarisa Abegg
|DF ||9 ||1 ||810 ||0 ||1 ||5 ||6 ||0 ||0 
|- align=center
| ||18 ||align=left|BazzaroneAshley Bazzarone
|DF ||1 ||0 ||49 ||0 ||0 ||0 ||0 ||0 ||0 
|- align=center
| ||20 ||align=left|DeWolfeJerica DeWolfe
|DF ||10 ||2 ||855 ||1 ||0 ||5 ||2 ||0 ||0 
|- align=center
| ||21 ||align=left|NairnChristine Nairn
|MF ||4 ||7 ||360 ||3 ||1 ||20 ||3 ||0 ||0 
|- align=center
| ||23 ||align=left|HovingtonBri Hovington
|DF ||8 ||4 ||634 ||1 ||2 ||7 ||4 ||0 ||0 
|- align=center
| ||26 ||align=left|CrampKatie Cramp
|MF ||7 ||0 ||218 ||0 ||0 ||1 ||2 ||0 ||0 
|- align=center
| ||27 ||align=left|MalagariDanielle Malagari
|MF ||10 ||2 ||618 ||0 ||2 ||20 ||3 ||0 ||0 
|- align=center
| ||28 ||align=left|Watson, M.Megan Watson
|DF ||7 ||0 ||505 ||0 ||0 ||2 ||1 ||0 ||0

Honors

References

External links 

D.C. United Women seasons
Dc United Women
D.C. United
D.C. United Women season